Same-sex marriage in Jersey has been legal since 1 July 2018. The States Assembly passed a bill allowing same-sex couples to marry on 1 February 2018. Royal assent was granted on 23 May 2018, and the law took effect on 1 July.

Jersey, a Crown dependency of the United Kingdom, also provides civil partnerships for same-sex couples. A bill for legalisation received royal assent on 14 December 2011 and was registered in the Royal Court on 6 January 2012. It took effect on 2 April 2012.

Civil partnerships

In August 2009, Chief Minister Terry Le Sueur announced that a bill to allow civil partnerships, offering same-sex couples some of the rights and benefits of marriage, would be drafted and be due for introduction to the Assembly of the States Assembly in October 2009.

On 20 October 2009, the Assembly voted in favour of civil partnerships "in principle". The vote was 48 in favour, 1 against and 4 abstaining. A draft bill legalising civil partnerships was approved by the Council of Ministers on 24 March 2011 and introduced to the Assembly on 31 May. The Assembly passed it on 12 July 2011. On 14 December 2011, the bill received royal assent and was registered in the Royal Court on 6 January 2012. In March 2012, the Government of Jersey issued orders implementing the law, which took effect on 2 April 2012.

In March 2022, the States Assembly passed a bill allowing opposite-sex couples to enter into civil partnerships as well. The law will enter into effect on a date yet to be determined by the government.

Same-sex marriage
On 28 May 2014, Deputy Sam Mézec of the Reform Jersey party submitted a proposition asking the States Assembly to support, in principle, the legalisation of same-sex marriage, and to request the Chief Minister to prepare the necessary draft legislation to give effect to the proposal. On 8 July 2014, the Assembly voted for an amendment to the proposal, introduced by Senator Ian Le Marquand, to request the Chief Minister to present a detailed study into the effects of allowing same-sex marriage by 31 December 2014. The amendment was passed by 24 votes to 18 and the amended proposition by 39 to 1.

On 26 November 2014, Chief Minister Ian Gorst submitted a report, which included a commitment to introduce legislation allowing same-sex couples to marry in civil and religious ceremonies by the end of 2017, and to create safeguards for religious organisations and officials who do not wish to conduct same-sex marriages, among others. On 14 July 2015, the Chief Minister submitted a proposition to ask the States to decide whether they agree, in principle, that same-sex couples should be allowed to marry and to request that the draft legislation necessary to implement it be introduced for approval by the States no later than January 2017. It was approved by the Assembly on 22 September 2015, 37 to 4.

On 14 March 2017, following an oral question by Deputy Mézec, the Chief Minister stated that the bill would be lodged in anticipation for debate in the summer of 2017 and would come into force by December of the same year. However, on 8 September 2017, the Chief Minister said that the bill would be delayed and that it would not be in force until at least spring 2018. A draft same-sex marriage bill was eventually introduced to the States Assembly on 3 October 2017. The States debated the bill on 16 November 2017 and agreed to its principles but sent it for further review to the Corporate Services Scrutiny Panel. The panel's report was presented to the States on 29 January 2018. Controversially, the report included a recommendation asking the States to approve a "tolerance clause" in the bill, which would have allowed traders to refuse to serve same-sex couples goods and services in accordance with their religious beliefs.

The "tolerance clause" was strenuously opposed by equality and diversity campaigners in Jersey. The equality charity Liberate organised an online petition that received over 5,000 signatures opposing the inclusion of the clause. The charity gathered key support from members of church groups and wedding suppliers opposing the clause.

A final vote on the bill by the States occurred on 1 February 2018, where it passed 42–1. The tolerance clause amendment was rejected by a vote of 40–5. The bill was granted royal assent in the Privy Council on 23 May 2018 and registered in the Royal Court on 1 June. On 26 June, the States approved a proposition to commence the law on 1 July 2018. The first same-sex marriage was performed on 9 July 2018 in Saint Helier between Neil Renouf and John Cronin.

Jersey law defines "same sex marriage" as "the marriage of 2 persons of the same sex and includes a marriage by conversion [from a civil partnership]".

Religious performance
The Methodist Church of Great Britain has allowed its ministers to conduct same-sex marriages since 2021. The Methodist Conference voted 254 to 46 in favour of the move. A freedom of conscience clause allows ministers with objections to opt out of performing same-sex weddings.

The smaller United Reformed Church has allowed its churches to perform same-sex marriages since 2016. The Quakers also perform same-sex marriages.

See also

LGBT rights in Jersey
Recognition of same-sex unions in Europe

Notes

References

External links
 
 

Same-sex marriage
Same-sex marriage in the Crown Dependencies
2018 in LGBT history